This is a list of prime ministers of Chad since the formation of the post of Prime Minister of Chad in 1978 to the present day.

A total of eighteen people have served as Prime Minister of Chad (not counting one Acting Prime Minister). Additionally, two persons, Delwa Kassiré Koumakoye and Albert Pahimi Padacké, have served on two non-consecutive occasions.

The current Prime Minister of Chad is Saleh Kebzabo, since 12 October 2022.

Key
Political parties

Other factions

Status

List of officeholders

See also
 Politics of Chad
 List of heads of state of Chad
 Vice President of Chad
 List of colonial governors of Chad

External links
 World Statesmen – Chad

Chad
Political history of Chad
Government of Chad
 
1978 establishments in Chad
2018 disestablishments in Chad
Prime ministers
Prime ministers